Ma Sandar (born 4 September  1947) is a well known Burmese writer.  With a clear and engaging style, her works reflect the daily struggles of the people living in Myanmar. Her novella, Life's Dream, Flower's Dream won the 1994 Myanmar National Literature Award for novella. Her short stories collection, Short Stories Collection 3 won the 1999 Myanmar National Literature Award for Collected Short Stories. Another novella, Hexagon won the 2002 National Literature Award for novella. 10 of her novels have been made into movies.

Early life and education
She was born in Yangon and attended the Myoma All-Girls High School. She graduated in 1965, and her first short story, Me, the Teacher was published in a magazine in the same year. She attended Rangoon Institute of Technology with a major in architecture. After graduating, she worked in the Ministry of Construction, Architecture Team 2. Her first novel Don't Know Because I am Young was published in 1972. Throughout her life, she has produced so far, over 100 short short stories and short stories, 2 novellas and 13 novels.

Selected works

Novels
 Sum
 Pending of New Green Leaves
 Tomorrow 
 Rose
 Cloudy Moon
 Keeping Bad Mood in Mind Silently 
 Please Fulfill My Blank 
 G Hall Thu
 Circle
 Don't Know Because I Am Young 
 Star Flower 
 The Shadow

Novella
 Life's Dream, Flower's Dream
 Hexagon

Short stories
 Short Stories Collection 3
 Me, the Teacher

Awards
 In 1994, National Literary Award for novella
 In 1999, Myanmar National Literature Award for Collected Short Stories
 In 2002, National Literary Award for novella

References

1947 births
Living people
Burmese novelists
People from Yangon
20th-century Burmese women writers
21st-century Burmese women writers
20th-century Burmese writers
21st-century Burmese writers